Megaladapis, informally known as the koala lemur, was a genus belonging to the family Megaladapidae, consisting of three extinct species of lemurs that once inhabited the island of Madagascar.

Adaptations 
Megaladapis was quite different from any living lemur. Its body was squat and built like that of the modern koala. Its long arms, fingers, feet, and toes were specialized for grasping trees, and its legs were splayed for vertical climbing. The hands and feet were curved and the ankles and wrists did not have the usual stability needed to travel on the ground that most other lemurids have. Its pedal morphology suggests Megaladapis evolved to live in an arboreal environment. Its foot had a large hallux and lateral abductor musculature that helped it to grasp vertically on trees, features shared by other arboreal species. Its head was unlike that of any other primate; most strikingly, its eyes were on the sides of its skull, instead of forward on the skull as in all other primates.

Its long canine teeth and cow-like jaw formed a tapering snout. Its jaw muscles were powerful for chewing the tough native vegetation. Based on the microwear patterns of its teeth, Megaladapis is believed to have been folivorous, using a leaf-cropping foraging method. These patterns found no permanent upper incisors or the presence of an expanded articular facet on the posterior face of the mandibular condyle. This diet and similar phenotypic traits of the teeth are the basis for concluding a shared ancestry with the Lepilemur. The diet, however, might be the factor that influences the dental development. Species with a larger brain, later initiation of molar crowns, and longer formation of crown are considered to have more of an omnivorous diet. In contrast, Megaladapis lived on a folivorous diet, despite having a smaller brain, early initiation of molar crowns, and fast crown formation.

Its body weight reached . Other estimates suggest  but its still much larger than any extanct lemur. The shape of its skull was unique among all known primates, with a nasal region which showed similarities to those of rhinoceros, a feature that probably combined with an enlarged upper lip for grasping leaves. It had the largest body size of any lemur, with double the body mass of the next largest extinct lemur. An endocast of its skull showed that it had a brain capacity of about 250 cc, about 3 to 4 times the size of a domestic cat's, which is small for its size when compared to other lemurs. Compared to the size of the skull, the diameter of the orbits protrudes outwards and forwards in a tabular form, suggesting that Megaladapis was diurnal. Based on when molar crown initiation occurred, Megaladapis gestation period is thought to have been at least 198 days, but was likely longer.

The island's topography was always changing, and like other lemurs, Megaladapis was specialized within its own niche. The general expectations of tree climbers such as Megaladapis is that with an increase in size, the body's forelimbs will also increase proportionally.

Some exterior scratches and incisions were found on both its metatarsus and its mandibula. The cuts on the metatarsus are comparable to those found in caves and are thought to have been produced by humans, while those on the mandibula seem to have been produced by some instrument engineered for cutting – indications that the Megalapadis was at some point in direct contact with the anatomically-modern humans of its time.

There are several well-preserved fragments of the upper and lower jaw. The upper molars of Lepilemur are very close in shape to those of Megaladapis. The main difference between the two is that the outer crown-surface of Lepilemur molars forms a nearly straight line, almost parallel with the long axis of the skull, and the outer side is slightly concave inwards. The antero-internal cingulum is missing in the molars of Lepilemur.

Details about the anterior parts of the dentition, the canines and incisors, are difficult to determine. The bulle osseve are broken away. The foremost facial portion and base of the skull is also wanting. Based on the wear on the teeth, the obliteration of most of the sutures of the very thick bones, and the strongly developed crests, it is believed to have been an elderly individual.

Cultural references 
It is often believed that Malagasy legends of the tretretretre or tratratratra, an extinct animal, refer to Megaladapis, but the details of these tales, notably the "human-like" face of the animal, match the related Palaeopropithecus much better.

Extinction 
When humans arrived on Madagascar 2,300 years ago, in addition to the species alive today, there were at least 17 species of now-extinct "giant" lemur, including Megaladapis. The landscape in which giant lemurs were found were largely forested areas with dense vegetation. Almost directly after human arrival, there was a rapid decline in the spores of Sporormiella which indicates a decrease in megafaunal biomass. Charcoal microparticles being found in surveys of various areas in Madagascar give evidence to the fact that human habitat modification only occurred after this decline in megafaunal biomass. Charcoal deposits provide evidence to the fact that humans used fire to clear large pieces of land very rapidly. The habitats that Megaladapis once lived in were very well adapted to be turned into grasslands, which provided little to no cover from outside forces for these creatures. Thus, the scientific conclusion arrived upon is one that hypothesizes that "giant" lemur populations, like the Megaladapis, were on the decline due to habitat fragmentation, and human activities (for example, clearing of land through "slash-and-burn" techniques) were the final push to extinction for these lemurs between 500 and 600 years ago.

Over-hunting by humans was also deemed a major contributor to the extinction of "giant" lemurs. Minor droughts are frequent in Madagascar, but a major drought approximately 1000 years ago significantly lowered lake levels, caused a severe vegetation transition, and caused fires to spark in fire-prone grasslands and savannas. Crop failures due to these conditions would drive inhabitants to hunt for bushmeat to survive, and these giant lemurs were an easy source of said meat.

Megaladapis were slow-moving, bulky creatures that were diurnal, or active during the day. Lemurs in general also had small group sizes and were highly seasonal breeders (they breed for about one to two weeks a year). These features already put them at an evolutionary disadvantage; Megaladapis (along with the other species of giant lemur) were more susceptible to predators (humans more specifically), forest fires, and habitat destruction due to these traits. The low breeding rates also made recovery from devastating loss of life among the species very difficult to recover from, as evidenced by the eventual extinction of Megaladapis.

Gallery

References

External links 

 Megaladapis edwardsi: Scientific information
 AMNH Bestiary

Subfossil lemurs
Lemur genera
Prehistoric primate genera
Prehistoric animals of Madagascar
Holocene extinctions
Fossil taxa described in 1894
Taxa named by Charles Immanuel Forsyth Major